Johnny and the Semitones (later known as The Semitones) were a 1960s archetypal English beat group.  Formed in Timperley, Altrincham, Cheshire, they were a popular local band on the Manchester music scene and supported national and international acts such as The Hollies, The Mindbenders and The Rolling Stones.

Classic band line-up
John Dixon – lead vocalist
Keith Leigh – rhythm guitarist and vocals
Mike Smith – bass guitarist
Stuart Sumner – drummer
Roger Heywood – lead guitarist

External links
 Manchesterbeat.com
 
 Index of British rock bands 1963–66

English rock music groups
Musical groups from Greater Manchester
Beat groups
People from Altrincham